The Winnipesaukee River is a  river that connects Lake Winnipesaukee with the Pemigewasset and Merrimack rivers in Franklin, New Hampshire. The river is in the Lakes Region of central New Hampshire.

The river has two distinct sections. The upstream section consists of a series of river courses connecting a chain of lakes, beginning with Lake Winnipesaukee. From the dam at the outlet of Lake Winnipesaukee in the Lakeport section of Laconia, the river almost immediately enters Opechee Bay.  down the lake, the river exits over a dam and drops through the center of Laconia, its banks lined by industrial buildings from the 19th century that were constructed to take advantage of the river's power. The  section through Laconia ends at Lake Winnisquam, the fourth-largest lake in New Hampshire. A  stretch across Winnisquam leads to the dam at the lake's outlet and a short descent to Silver Lake.

The river's lower section begins at the natural outlet of Silver Lake, on the boundary between Belmont and Tilton, New Hampshire. The river passes through the center of the twin towns of Tilton and Northfield, then descends through a narrow valley to Franklin where additional small dams use the river's power. A USGS water gage is in Tilton.

The Winnipesaukee River joins the Pemigewasset River just downstream from the center of Franklin, forming the Merrimack River.

See also 

 List of New Hampshire rivers

References

External links 

 American Whitewater information on running the river
  Lake Winnipesaukee Live
 

Tributaries of the Merrimack River
Rivers of New Hampshire
Rivers of Merrimack County, New Hampshire
New Hampshire placenames of Native American origin